The Military Air-Scout (1911) is considered by some aviation film historians as one of the first aviation films recorded worldwide.  William J. Humphrey directed the two-reeler in 1911, with the cooperation of the U.S. Army authorities who allowed Lt. Henry Arnold, a pioneer military pilot to carry out stunt flying for the film.

Plot
In 1914, the commanding officer of the U.S. Army (Alec B. Francis), with his daughter, Marie (Edith Storey), and Lieutenant Wentworth (Earle Williams), are watching the flight of the latest military aircraft. Wentworth studies aviation and after becoming a pilot, makes his first flight, witnessed by the general's daughter, his sweetheart.

At an informal luncheon, Commander Arthur learns the United States is at war and has to face European enemies. Lieutenant Wentworth is ordered to attack the enemy's fleet, succeeding in sinking two of the enemy battleships.

The enemy shoots down Wentworth on his next flight. Extracting himself from the wreckage, he is badly injured with a broken arm, but manages to report back to his headquarters. He tells Commander Arthur what has occurred, and after recovery at an army hospital, is reunited with Marie. His brave and daring deeds were well received, and Commander Arthur now accepts him as a prospective son-in-law.

Cast
 Earle Williams as Lieutenant Wentworth
 Edith Storey as Marie Arthur
 Alec B. Francis as Commander Arthur - Marie's Father

Production
The Military Air-Scout was filmed following the Aero Club of America Second International Aero Meet at Long Island, New York in September 1911. Beginning on September 30, 1911, U.S. Army Signal Corps pilot  Lt. Henry "Hap" Arnold was seconded to do the stunt flying, doubling for the lead actors. Arnold had brought his Army Wright Model F/Wright Burgess Hydro biplane from College Park Airport, Maryland, by train.

Flight operations were conducted from the Nassau Boulevard aerodrome, Garden City, Long Island, New York, and were completed in October 1911. Arnold, who picked up "a few extra bucks" for his services, became so excited about films that he almost quit the Army to become an actor." He would later fly again in The Elopement (1912), also filmed in October 1911.

References

Notes

Citations

Bibliography

 Copp, DeWitt S. A Few Great Captains: The Men and Events That Shaped the Development of U.S. Air Power. Garden City, New York: Doubleday & Company, Inc. for The Air Force Historical Foundation, 1980. .
 Hennessy, Juliette A. The United States Army Air Arm, April 1861 to April 1917. Maxwell Air Force Base, Alabama: USAF Historical Division, 1958. .
 Huston, John W.American Airpower Comes of Age: General Henry H. "Hap" Arnold's World War II Diaries. Maxwell Air Force Base, Alabama: Air University Press, 2002. .
 Paris, Michael. From the Wright Brothers to Top gun: Aviation, Nationalism, and Popular Cinema. Manchester, UK: Manchester University Press, 1995. .
 Pendo, Stephen. Aviation in the Cinema. Lanham, Maryland: Scarecrow Press, 1985. .
 Suid, Lawrence H. Guts and Glory: The Making of the American Military Image in Film. Lexington, Kentucky: The University Press of Kentucky, 2002. .

External links
 

1911 films
Silent American drama films
American black-and-white films
1911 drama films
1910s English-language films
American aviation films
American silent short films
Films directed by William J. Humphrey
1910s American films